Ae Bridgend is a hamlet in the Scottish council area of Dumfries and Galloway next to the River Ae. It is located at an altitude of 96.9 meters above sea level. It is the place where the trunk A701 road between Dumfries and Moffat crosses the Water of Ae.

See also 
Ae, Scotland

References 

Villages in Dumfries and Galloway